Robert Blees (June 9, 1918 Lathrop, Missouri – January 31, 2015) was an American writer and producer of films and television. He died on January 31, 2015.

Select filmography
 The Glass Web (1953)
 Cattle Queen of Montana (1954)
 Magnificent Obsession (1954)
 Autumn Leaves (1956)
 The Black Scorpion (1956)
 High School Confidential (1958)
 Screaming Mimi (1958)
 From the Earth to the Moon (1958)
 Whoever Slew Auntie Roo? (1972)
 Frogs (1972)
 Dr. Phibes Rises Again (1972)
 Project U.F.O. (1978–79) (TV series)
 Savage Harvest (1981)

References

External links

1918 births
2015 deaths
American male screenwriters
People from Clinton County, Missouri
Dartmouth College alumni
Time (magazine) people
Screenwriters from Missouri